Sligo is an unincorporated community in Currituck County, North Carolina, United States. It is south of Moyock on Route 168.  It was reportedly named after a minister, Edward Dromgoole, in 1783, and who missed his hometown of Sligo, Ireland.

References

Unincorporated communities in Currituck County, North Carolina
Unincorporated communities in North Carolina